El Tezal (when translated to english is The Complexion) is a suburban area of Cabo San Lucas, situated near to the Tourist Corridor which connects Los Cabos at an altitude of 30 meters. El Tezal is a residential zone, where have been built developments like Las Villas del Tezal, Palmeira, Rancho Pariaso Estate, Cumbre del Tezal, Toscana Cabos, Las Misiones, La Vista, Ventanas Hotel & Residences, Cabo del Mar and Camino del Mar. The 2010 census reported a population of 878 inhabitants.

References

External links 
 Localization of El Tezal
 2010 census tables: INEGI
 Mexico-Facts

Populated places in Baja California Sur